"Ruin My Life" is a song by Swedish singer Zara Larsson, released as a single on 18 October 2018. Initially released as a standalone single, the song was later included on Larsson's third studio album, Poster Girl. The single reached number two in Sweden, number five in The Republic of Ireland, and number nine in the United Kingdom. It is certified Gold or higher in ten countries.

Composition
"Ruin My Life" is a pop song, that has a drum track backed by an electric guitar and keyboard backed by synths. Paper described the song as "Larsson at her dreamiest with pensive piano breakdowns and cinematic sing-a-long choruses that roll into stadium-sized emotional crescendo after emotional crescendo. Larsson unearths a darker side of herself lyrically, diving into the dynamics of a toxic relationship. With a self-annihilating fatalism, Larsson's refrain of 'I want you to ruin my life/ruin my life/ruin my life' may seem naively reckless but, as the singer explains, taps into a more universal sentiment."

Promotion
Larsson announced the release of the song on Instagram in September 2018, also sharing the cover art. Larsson later appeared on BBC Radio 1 to talk about the song with Greg James.

Critical reception
Natasha Azarmi of Aftonbladet called the song a mix between the two moods of Larsson's previous album So Good, in that it is "quiet in the verses" and then picks up the pace for the chorus. Despite complimenting Larsson's "strong" voice and noting the song's "distinct beats" and "dreamy" sound, Azarmi said that the track "lacks enough sorrow and desperation" to be effective, and said that she hopes Larsson will show more "vulnerability" on her upcoming album.

Charts

Weekly charts

Year-end charts

Certifications

|-

Release history

References

2018 singles
2018 songs
Zara Larsson songs
Song recordings produced by the Monsters & Strangerz
Songs written by Stefan Johnson
Songs written by Jordan Johnson (songwriter)
Songs written by Sermstyle
Songs written by Zara Larsson
Songs written by Michael Pollack (musician)